The Aorere River is in the South Island of New Zealand.

The headwaters are within Kahurangi National Park. The river flows generally northwards for  before draining into Golden Bay at the town of Collingwood. The Heaphy Track's northeastern end is in the upper valley of the Aorere.

Tributaries of the Aorere include the Spey, Boulder, and Slate Rivers.

Two bridges were swept away, including the historic and recently restored Salisbury Swing Bridge.

References

Golden Bay
Rivers of New Zealand
Rivers of the Tasman District